Armand Cortes, sometimes credited as Armand Cortez, (August 16, 1880 – November 19, 1948) was an actor in theater and film in the United States. He had various theatrical roles in the late 1920s and early 1930s. 

In 1902 he was cast in the musical comedy The Messenger Boy. He was in the musical revue Star Time at the Majestic Theater in 1944.

He had various supporting roles in films. In 1918 he played the villain in Dodging a Million. He also played the villain in The Revenge of Tarzan.

He was born in Nîmes, France. He died in San Francisco.

Filmography
The House of Bondage (1914)
How Molly Made Good (1915)
The Big Sister (film) (1916)
Yellow Menace (1916), as Hong Kong Harry
Seven Keys to Baldpate (1917)
Her Better Self (1917)
 The Angel Factory (1917)
 The Road Between (1917)
Dodging a Million (1918)
The Servant Question (1920)
His Temporary Wife (1920)
The Revenge of Tarzan (1920)
 The Scarab Ring (1921)
 The Matrimonial Web (1921)
Wages of Virtue (1924)
Galloping Hoofs (1924)
The Crowded Hour (1925)
The Palm Beach Girl (1926)
The Music Master (film) (1927)
What an Idea (1932)
Bluebeard's Eighth Wife (1938)
Broadway Brevities

References

External links

 
 
 

American actors
1880 births
1948 deaths
20th-century American male actors
People from Nîmes
Male actors from San Francisco